Xie Mian (born 6 January 1932) is a contemporary Chinese writer and literary scholar based in Beijing. His piece "People that Read are Happy People" included in his 1997 book Eternal Campus and originally published in the July 19, 1995 edition of the China Reader's Report is one of the potential reading selections for Putonghua Proficiency Test test-takers.

References

1932 births
Living people
Peking University alumni
Academic staff of Peking University
Writers from Fuzhou